The Society of SS. Peter and Paul (SSPP) was an English Anglo-Catholic publishing company, sometimes mistakenly thought to have been in the tradition of Anglican Papalism. It was established in 1911 as a reaction to the works of the Anglican priest and liturgist Percy Dearmer, particularly The Parson's Handbook which advocated a liturgical style allegedly distinct to England, and rooted in the Sarum rite.

The society believed that the Church of England should follow the ceremonial development of the Western (Roman) Church, using the eucharistic rite of the 1549 Book of Common Prayer "enriched ceremonially and ritually from parent sources", and that the best means to accomplish this was to produce missals and other prayer books to promote and facilitate this endeavour.

The SSPP worked closely with the ecclesiastical artist Martin Travers to produce the desired aesthetic for the movement.

The society was responsible for the Anglican Missal, a liturgical book still used by some Anglo-Catholics and other high-church Anglicans.

References

External links
 

Anglo-Catholicism
Book publishing companies of the United Kingdom
Christian publishing companies